Adrian M. Hegyvary (born January 5, 1984 in Chicago) is an American track and road cyclist
.

Personal life
Hegyvary is married to New Zealand cyclist Rushlee Buchanan.

Major results

Road
2010
6th National Time Trial Championships

Track
2014
 1st  National Team Pursuit Championships (with Zach Allison, Alexander Darville and Zak Kovalcik)
2017
National Track Championships
1st  Madison (with Daniel Holloway
2018
National Track Championships
1st  Madison (with Daniel Holloway
UCI Track Races
1st , Madison (with Daniel Holloway); UCI Pan-American Championship  - Aquascalientes, Mexico
1st , Madison - Japan Track Cup I 
1st , Madison (with Daniel Holloway); UCI World Cup #5 - Cambridge, New Zealand
3rd , Madison (with Daniel Holloway); UCI World Cup #2 
2019
National Track Championships
1st  Madison (with Daniel Holloway
UCI Track Races
2nd , Madison (with Daniel Holloway); UCI Pan-American Championship

References

External links

 Adrian M. Hegyvary at the 2019 Pan American Games

1984 births
Living people
American male cyclists
Cyclists from Chicago
Cyclists at the 2019 Pan American Games
Pan American Games medalists in cycling
Pan American Games gold medalists for the United States
Pan American Games silver medalists for the United States
Medalists at the 2019 Pan American Games
Olympic cyclists of the United States
Cyclists at the 2020 Summer Olympics

American people of Hungarian descent
21st-century American people
American track cyclists